Aguacateros de Michoacán (English: Michoacán Avocado Growers) is a professional Mexican basketball team, based in Morelia, Michoacán. The Aguacateros are part of the Liga Nacional de Baloncesto Profesional, the top professional basketball league in Mexico. The team play their home games at the Auditorio de Usos Múltiples de la UMSNH, with a capacity of 3,500 spectators.

Aguacateros was founded in 2017, when the Garzas de Plata de la UAEH were moved to Morelia for the 2017–18 season.

History
Professional basketball in Michoacán dates back to 2006, when the Guerreros de Morelia team was established. The team, nevertheless, folded after the 2007–08 season.

In 2017, Garzas de Plata de la UAEH, a team that was part of the Autonomous University of the State of Hidalgo, had to leave the institution due to financial problems. The franchise then moved to Morelia and was rebranded as Aguacateros, meaning avocado growers.

The movement was officially announced on October 11, 2017 by Silvano Aureoles Conejo, Governor of Michoacán, who also stated that team was not being publicly funded by the State's government but privately by a group of businessmen.

Players

Current roster

Notable players
		
Jerome Meyinsse (born 1988)

References

External links 
 Official website 
 Team profile 

Basketball teams in Mexico
Basketball teams established in 2017
2017 establishments in Mexico
Sports teams in Michoacán
Morelia